Qianhai Shenzhen-Hong Kong Modern Service Industry Cooperation Zone is a commercial development in Shenzhen, Guangdong that is also known as Qianhai New District. The project is expected to be completed by 2020.

Strategic positioning 

According to plans made by the Qianhai administration, as the pilot district for cooperation between mainland China and Hong Kong and innovation in the service industry, Qianhai undertakes four functions:
 An area that will aim to facilitate innovation in the modern service industry
 An area that will aim to become a hub of modern services and modern service development
 A pilot area for closer cooperation between mainland China and Hong Kong
 A facilitator in the industrial reform and sustainable economic development of the Pearl River Delta

Features

Location 
Qianhai is situated in the Pearl River Delta. With the completion of railways and roads by 2020, Qianhai will be within a one-hour commuting radius of the Pearl River Delta and within a 30-minute commuting radius of Hong Kong. The main arteries of traffic in the region, including the Shenzhen-Zhongshan corridor, Shenzhen Western Port, Shenzhen North Station and Guangzhou-Shenzhen Yanjiang Highway all pass through Qianhai.

Industrial support 
The city of Shenzhen, where Qianhai is located, is one of the most economically developed regions in the Pearl River Delta and mainland China. As one of the most economically productive cities in China, Shenzhen has the highest GDP per capita, foreign export volume, the number of patent applications and the number of patents owned per capita among all major cities in China.

Special policies 
The following policies were approved by the State Council on June 27, 2012.

Financial policies 
 Qianhai shall experiment with the expansion of offshore RMB fund flow-back channels. Qianhai will support the development of Hong Kong as an offshore RMB settlement centre and establish a cross-border RMB innovation zone in order to facilitate the development of RMB financial services.
 Qianhai shall support the issuance of RMB loans from local banking institutions to international projects, and from Hong Kong-based banking institutions to Qianhai projects under the stipulations of the Mainland and Hong Kong Closer Economic Partnership Arrangement (CEPA).
 Qianhai shall be supported in its efforts to establish an equity investment parent fund in Qianhai.
 Hasten the internationalization of Qianhai's financial market by opening up to Hong Kong under the stipulations of CEPA
 Qianhai supports the development of innovative financial instruments, and financial products that support the development of the real economy.
 Hong Kong and international banking institutions shall be encouraged to establish their headquarters in Qianhai in order to quicken the pace of the internationalization of Qianhai's financial industry.

Taxation policies 
 Eligible companies registered in Qianhai are subject to a 15 percent preferential corporate income tax rate.
 Eligible professionals who are employed in Qianhai are exempt from personal income tax.

Legal policies 
 Qianhai shall support Hong Kong arbitration agencies' establishment of affiliated agencies in Qianhai.
 Qianhai shall support the joint operation of mainland and Hong Kong law firms under CEPA and its supplementary agreements.

Human resource policies 
 Qianhai's human resource management mechanism shall be innovated and relevant policies and measures shall be formulated to attract a professional, international workforce, including but not limited to professionals from Hong Kong, Macau, and Taiwan, as well as Chinese professionals who are currently working or studying abroad or those who have returned to China. 
 Professionals with certification from Hong Kong shall be permitted to provide professional services, the boundary of which is confined to Qianhai and to the enterprises and residents of Qianhai. The specific policies, measures, and regulations of such services shall be formulated by relevant regulatory departments.
 Professionals from Hong Kong with the certificates of Certified Public Accountant of China shall be permitted to serve as partners of mainland Chinese accounting firms. The pilot trial procedures will be formulated by Shenzhen and will be implemented in Qianhai upon the approval of the Ministry of Finance.

Education and health care policies 
 Hong Kong education service providers are permitted to set up international schools invested by Hong Kong investors in Qianhai upon approval. 
 Hong Kong health care service providers are permitted to establish hospitals invested by Hong Kong investors in Qianhai.

Telecommunications policies 
 Hong Kong and Macau telecom operators are permitted to establish telecom joint ventures with mainland Chinese operators in Qianhai under the stipulations of CEPA.
 Qianhai will establish a dedicated telecommunications channel in order to provide a better and faster channel for telecom businesses as well as other firms in Qianhai.

Future leading industries 
As a modern service industry cooperation zone, Qianhai's administration has planned to focus on finance, modern logistics, information services, technology services, and other professional services.

Finance 
The Qianhai administration plans to promote innovation and partnership within the financial industry by relaxing currency flows between Qianhai and Hong Kong, reinforcing Hong Kong's position as an offshore RMB settlement centre. This initiative is meant to spearhead the internationalisation of Shenzhen's capital market, as well as strengthen the partnership between securities markets in Shenzhen and Hong Kong. Qianhai's financial services will aim to complement that of Hong Kong's, in a conscious effort to avoid direct competition and create a win-win situation.

More specifically, Hong Kong banks will be allowed to extend commercial RMB loans to Qianhai-based onshore mainland entities. The People's Bank of China has also indicated that such loans will for the first time not be subject to the benchmark rates set by the central bank for all other loans in the rest of China. The beginning of this "cross-border yuan loan program has opened a new channel for the back flow of overseas yuan funds, which will increase the yuan’s global liquidity and promote its internationalisation,” according to Linan Liu, a senior strategist for greater China at Deutsche Bank AG.

Qianhai Equity Trading Centre 
The Qianhai Equity Trading Centre will provide loans to Qianhai enterprises by launching RMB-denominated wealth management products (WMPs) on the Hong Kong capital market.

Modern logistics 
Qianhai has implemented preferential policies which will effectively allow logistics providers to offer improved and more flexible services across mainland China and globally.

Qianhai Bay Free Trade Port Zone 
The Qianhai Bay Free Trade Port Zone is one of the vital components of the Qianhai Shenzhen-Hong Kong Modern Service Industry Cooperation Zone.

Information services 
The Qianhai administration will promote the development of software and information technology services, as well as facilitate the cooperation between mainland and Hong Kong telecom operators.

Technology and other professional services 
Qianhai will give priority to the development of innovative technologies, creative design services, as well as professional services such as consulting and management. As industrial reform is now underway in the Pearl River Delta, Qianhai's strategic positioning includes the plan to provide manufacturers with new technologies and other professional services to support their reforming efforts and facilitate a smoother transition.

Urban planning 
According to the city blueprint, Qianhai's residents will have access to a park and greenery within , the ability to reach public transportation within , shopping malls, restaurants, and hotels within , and education and health care services within  of any given point in the city. In order to attract and retain a creative workforce, the Qianhai administration has claimed that it will aim to establish an internationalised education system, as well as a Hong Kong-standard health care system.

The Qianhai administration has stated that it will prioritise public transportation and sustainable development. All Qianhai buildings will meet international environmental standards, and the energy consumption of buildings will be closely monitored and controlled. There is a planned 150 million yuan investment in reforestation, and investments in clean energy, water and waste recycling as well as sustainable urban management.

Current projects

Qianhai Enterprise Dream Park 
An example of Qianhai's future work environment, the Qianhai Enterprise Dream Park is modelled after the Silicon Valley, with 58 office buildings and a multi-purpose building that can be used as a conference and exhibition hall and an exchange platform. Companies who are planning to move in or have already moved in include the Hong Kong and Shanghai Banking Corporation (HSBC), Hang Seng Bank, Industrial and Commercial Bank of China (ICBC), China Mobile, etc. Although some companies have moved in, there is still ongoing construction. The area will be completed by the end of 2014.

Qianhai Youth Entrepreneur Innovation Hub 
The Qianhai Youth Hub is an area that will become a community dedicated to the facilitation of innovation in young entrepreneurs, providing them with sources of venture capital, the advantage of starting up in one of the most active economies in China, and the opportunity to network with companies as well as like-minded individuals from abroad, particularly Hong Kong youths. The cost of research and startup in the Qianhai Youth Hub will be partially subsidised.

The prioritised industries in this area are consistent with Qianhai's overall blueprint, including innovative technology, information technology, modern logistics, and cultural and artistic innovation. The development of professional services such as finance, accounting, and law, as well as computer science, e-commerce, statistical analysis, animation, new media, 3-D printing, design, virtual reality, and clean energy are strongly supported by the Qianhai administration. The Hub will have facilities that help youth entrepreneurs obtain funds from venture capital, public funds, and subsidies from the Qianhai administration, providing them with the resources to either initiate an idea or continue developing their innovation. In addition, the Qianhai Youth Hub is situated beside the Qianhai Enterprise Dream Park, giving the youth entrepreneurs a chance to network with companies, offers for careers, and venture capital.

In addition to a lab area with facilities such as recording studios and 3-D printing labs, participants in the Qianhai Youth Hub will have access to the facilities in most public labs for free. There is an instructional building where professors and professionals give seminars, career advice, or provide professional guidance to youth entrepreneurs, and an exhibition hall for the participants' work and ideas. International and Hong Kong youth participation in this hub is strongly supported by the Qianhai administration. This community will be managed by the Qianhai administration, the Hong Kong Federation of Youths, and the Shenzhen Youth Federation. This project will be completed by the end of 2014.

References

External links 
 Official Chinese Website
 Regulations on Qianhai Shenzhen-Hong Kong Modern Service Industrial Cooperation Area of Shenzhen Special Economic Zone

Shenzhen